Martha Stahr Carpenter was an American astronomer and president of the AAVSO for three terms between 1951 and 1954. In 1947, she became the first women faculty member in the Cornell University College of Arts and Sciences. Stahr advised distinguished astronomer Vera Rubin in galactic dynamics while at Cornell, after which, Rubin went on to provide the first evidence for dark matter using galactic rotation curves.

Research
Stahr's research interests included observations of variable stars, galactic structure using 21-cm emission, and microwave radio astronomy. During her graduate studies between 1944 and 1945, she was able to use the Lick Observatory as a student because very few astronomers were around during war time. She recounted in 2011, 

She published the first comprehensive bibliography of scientific literature on microwave radio sources in 1948 and continued to provide updated supplements throughout her career to help astronomers around the world discover and remain informed of recent research done in radio astronomy.

References 

20th-century American women scientists
American women astronomers
Cornell University faculty
American women academics
University of California, Berkeley alumni